"Bang Bang" is a song by recording artists Jessie J, Ariana Grande and Nicki Minaj. It was written by Max Martin, Savan Kotecha, Rickard Göransson, Grande and Minaj. It was produced by Martin, Göransson, and Ilya, with Kuk Harrell serving as a vocal producer. The song was first sent to hot adult contemporary radio on 28 July 2014 through Republic Records and released as a digital download the next day by Lava and Republic Records as the lead single from Jessie J's third studio album Sweet Talker (2014). It is also included on the deluxe version of Grande's second studio album My Everything (2014), serving as the third single from that album.

"Bang Bang" debuted at number six and later peaked to number three on the US Billboard Hot 100. It debuted at number one in the United Kingdom becoming Jessie's third number one, Grande's second number one debut that year, and marked Minaj's first number one single on the chart. The song reached the top ten in multiple other countries including Belgium, Bulgaria, Canada, Denmark, Finland, Ireland, Israel, Netherlands, New Zealand, Scotland, and South Korea. The song received universal acclaim for Jessie and Grande's vocal performance, its production, and Minaj's verse. "Bang Bang" was nominated for Best Pop Duo/Group Performance at the 57th Grammy Awards in 2015 and won Favorite Song of the Year at the 2015 Kids' Choice Awards. In February 2021, "Bang Bang" was certified eight-times platinum by the RIAA, and has sold 3.5 million copies in the US since its release.

Background
The song was written by Savan Kotecha, Ariana Grande, Max Martin, and Carolina Liar guitarist Rickard Göransson, while the latter two co-produced it with Ilya Salmanzadeh. Minaj added her rap later. Martin had already previously collaborated with Jessie J ("Domino"), Grande ("Problem", "Break Free"), and Minaj ("Va Va Voom", "Masquerade").

The song was originally offered to and recorded by Grande, who didn't like the result. Republic Records EVP Wendy Goldstein then sent it to EVP Rob Stevenson who got a demo of the song played to Jessie J, which she decided to record. Following her recording, Republic Records sent it to Minaj to record her verse. Goldstein then sent it to CEO Monte Lipman, who insisted that Grande listen to it. Grande was impressed, surprised by Jessie J and Minaj also being on the song, and agreed to remain on the song. However, in interviews, Jessie J stated she recorded it first and that Martin wanted Grande on it too, so it is unclear if Jessie bent the truth or was not told by executives that Grande was first to record.

Jessie later said that "It was like a real females, coming together, empowering, supportive [vibe], and then Nicki jumping on it was like the icing on the cake."

On various dates in July 2014, each of the artists uploaded snippets of the song on each of their Instagram profiles: Jessie J on 9 July, Minaj on 23 July, and Grande on 4 July.

Composition

"Bang Bang" is an up-tempo, "soulful" song, that features a "clap-heavy" production, built over "big bouncy beats and horn blasts." The song mixes pop with Minaj's rap verses making it a hip pop song. It's in the key of C Mixolydian mode, with the vocals making use of the C blues scale. The tempo is 150 BPM (Allegro). The melody of the chorus has been compared to the melody of the first line of "Wake Me Up Before You Go-Go" by Wham!.

Critical reception
"Bang Bang" received widespread acclaim from critics. Rob Sheffield of Rolling Stone called the song a "perfect Max Martin throwdown" that "fuses Nelly's 'Country Grammar' with Wham!'s 'Wake Me Up Before You Go-Go,' which is some truly twisted pop archaeology."
Carolyn Menyes from Music Times called the song "[a] Huge successful hit of Summer 2014" and thought that "[the] song is going straight to the top of the charts." Zach Frydenlund from Complex praised Jessie J's and Ariana's heavenly vocals in the song but concentrated more on Nicki's "catchy killer verse" stating that "it's Nicki who really steals the show with her verse". Jason Lipshutz from Billboard responded positively to the song, saying that the song itself "[is] composed of piercing vocals courtesy of two contemporary crooners, as well as rapid-fire spitting from the hottest female MC on the planet, "Bang Bang" rests tidily upon the Jessie J assertion, "See anybody could be good to you/You need a bad girl to blow your mind."

Vulture's Lindsey Weber thought the song was "no 'Lady Marmalade,'" but praised it saying "it's catchy enough to make a splash.” Chris Martins from Spin stated that the song is "powerful", and credits Minaj for the song's noteworthy energy. "What makes the track so big? Well, um, ask Nicki Minaj." He goes on to further praise Minaj's performance on the song, affirming that "The 'Anaconda'-taming MC rips a few mics on the loud and proud pop-soul song." Lewis Corner from Digital Spy gave the song four and a half stars out of five and said that is "one of the year's most electrifying pop anthems."

Accolades

Commercial performance
In the United States, "Bang Bang" debuted atop the Billboard Digital Songs chart selling 230,000 digital downloads in the week ending August 3, 2014, becoming Grande's and Minaj's second chart-topper there, and Jessie J's first. Its first-week sales also marked the third-largest sales debut for a song in 2014, behind Grande's own "Problem" and Taylor Swift's "Shake It Off", both of which were co-written by Max Martin. The song launched on the US Billboard Hot 100 at number six, making it the second-highest new entry of 2014 on that chart at the time, also behind Grande's "Problem". The song marked Jessie J's second, Grande's third, and Minaj's tenth top ten single in the United States. It also became Grande's second consecutive top ten hit of 2014, after "Problem" which peaked at number two for five weeks. In its second week on the Hot 100, "Bang Bang" slid down to number nine selling an additional 141,000 digital downloads. The song rebounded following the release of its music video and reached a peak of number three, holding that position for two non-consecutive weeks, being kept off the top spot by Meghan Trainor's "All About That Bass" and Swift's "Shake It Off". Overall, "Bang Bang" spent sixteen consecutive weeks in the top ten, and a total of 31 weeks charting on the Hot 100.

On Billboards Mainstream Top 40 (Pop Songs) chart, the song debuted at number 19 and reached a peak of number two, becoming Jessie J's highest hit single since her 2012 single "Domino" also peaked at number two there. The song became Grande's second-highest peak at the time after "Problem" topped the chart. It also was Minaj's third number-two hit on that chart after her collaborations with Justin Bieber on "Beauty and a Beat" and David Guetta on "Turn Me On". Grande and Minaj would later reach number one with "Side to Side" in 2016. On the Streaming Songs chart, the song debuted at number 21 registering 3 million streams in its first week, and reached the top position on the issue dated 13 September 2014. In Canada, the single peaked at number three on the Canadian Hot 100, equaling "Problem" as Grande's highest peak in the country at the time. The song was later certified triple platinum in March 2015 for selling over 240,000 units there.

In the United Kingdom, "Bang Bang" debuted at number one on the UK Singles Chart with 92,000 downloads, becoming Jessie J's third, Grande's second, and Minaj's first number-one single in the country. It consequently became the first song by a lead female rapper to debut at the top spot, and the third song by a female rapper to reach number one overall since Missy Elliott's feature on "I Want You Back" in 1998 and Lil' Kim's feature on "Lady Marmalade" in 2001. The single has since been certified double platinum by the BPI for shipments of over 1.2 million copies in the United Kingdom. On the Irish Singles Chart, the track reached number three. In Australia, "Bang Bang"  peaked at number four on the Australian ARIA Charts, her third consecutive top-five single there. It also peaked at number one on the Urban Singles Chart and was certified triple platinum by the Australian Recording Industry Association (ARIA) for shipments of over 210,000 copies. Internationally, the song has also peaked within the top ten of the charts in Belgium, Bulgaria, Canada, Denmark, Finland, Ireland, Israel, Netherlands, New Zealand, Scotland, and South Korea.

Music video
The song's accompanying video was shot over two days in Los Angeles, California, and was directed by Hannah Lux Davis. The video was officially previewed and teased in a Beats by Dr. Dre commercial that aired on 20 August 2014. Following the ad's airing, it was announced that the music video would arrive shortly after the trio's performance at the 2014 MTV Video Music Awards. On 24 August 2014, the official video was uploaded on MTV's website and was available for international viewing. On 25 August 2014, the video was released via Jessie J's Vevo account and was Vevo-certified on 5 November, having surpassed 110 million views.

Live performances
Jessie J, Ariana Grande, and Nicki Minaj performed the song together at the 2014 MTV Video Music Awards on 24 August 2014, in Inglewood, California, following the performances of Grande's "Break Free" and Minaj's "Anaconda". They sang it at the 2014 American Music Awards on 23 November 2014 in Los Angeles, California. 

In November 2014, Grande performed the song with Little Big Town at the 48th Annual Country Music Association Awards. She performed the song by herself at the 2014 Victoria's Secret Fashion Show in London, UK on 9 December 2014 and during her international tour, The Honeymoon Tour. Since the start of the Dangerous Woman Tour, Grande has also sung the song herself.  Grande also performed the song with Minaj at the NBA All-Star Game halftime show on 15 February 2015, as well as at the iHeartRadio Music Festival.

Grande and Minaj performed the song in April 2019 at the Coachella Valley Music and Arts Festival despite there being audio problems with Minaj's mic. On 18 April 2020, Jessie J performed the song by herself in One World: Together at Home in her house during the COVID-19 pandemic.  

Other usage
The song has been featured in the short-lived CBS TV drama series Stalker.
"Bang Bang" was used in a dance sequence between Emily Fields and Hanna Marin on the hit Freeform Teen drama series Pretty Little Liars.
The song became a recurring joke on the podcast Comedy Bang! Bang! when House of Lies actor Ben Schwartz began singing the song with altered lyrics to be about the show itself.
In 2018, the song was featured in the "lip sync for the crown" segment of drag queen reality competition RuPaul's Drag Race, where contestants Aquaria, Kameron Michaels and Eureka O'Hara had to lipsync to it in order to win the show's tenth season.
In October 2019, the song was used by Cadillac in an advertisement for its 2019 XT4 vehicle. A lyric in the song uses the company's name.
Grammy Award-winning singer Michelle Williams performed the song on the second US series of The Masked Singer as the "Butterfly".
The song was performed in the seventh episode of the South Korean music reality program Produce 101; the performance became a trending topic on social media with Jessie J sharing its video on her Facebook page. Jessie J's response later made the program's executive producer Han Dong-chul proud in an interview on 10 March 2016, saying: "It’s such an honor that the original singer of the song has mentioned our show. And I’m also proud that our contestants performed it so well."

Formats and track listingsCD single"Bang Bang" – 3:19
"Bang Bang" (Jessie J solo version) – 3:11Digital download"Bang Bang" – 3:19

 Digital download – Remixes EP"Bang Bang" (Dada Life Remix) – 3:34
"Bang Bang" (Kat Krazy Remix) – 3:57
"Bang Bang" (3LAU Remix) – 3:06
"Bang Bang" (Imanos and Gramercy Remix) – 3:44
"Bang Bang" (Super Stylers Remix) – 3:33

 Streaming – Remixes'''
"Bang Bang" (Dada Life Remix) – 3:34
"Bang Bang" (Kat Krazy Remix) – 3:57
"Bang Bang" (3LAU Remix) – 3:06
"Bang Bang" (Imanos and Gramercy Remix) – 3:44
"Bang Bang" (Super Stylers Remix) – 3:33
"Bang Bang" (iLL BLU Mix Radio Edit) – 3:44

Credits and personnel
Credits adapted from My Everything'' deluxe edition liner notes.

Recording
Jessie J's vocals recorded at Metropolis Studios (London)
Ariana Grande's vocals recorded at Conway Recording Studios (Los Angeles, California)
Nicki Minaj's vocals recorded at Glenwood Place Studios (Burbank, California)
Mixed at MixStar Studios (Virginia Beach, Virginia)
Mastered at Sterling Sound (New York City, New York)

Management
MXM (administered by Kobalt) (ASCAP) and Harajuku Barbie Music/Money Mack Music/Songs of Universal, Inc. (BMI)
Nicki Minaj appears courtesy of Young Money Entertainment/Cash Money Records

Personnel

Jessie J – lead vocals
Ariana Grande – lead vocals, songwriting
Nicki Minaj – lead vocals, songwriting
Max Martin – songwriting, production for MXM Productions, programming, keyboards
Rickard Göransson – songwriting, production for MXM Productions, programming, guitars, bass, keyboards, percussion, background vocals
Savan Kotecha – songwriting
Ilya – production for Wolf Cousins Productions, programming, background vocals
Peter Carlsson – vocal engineering, drums, percussion
Johan Carlsson – keyboards
Kuk Harrell – vocal production, vocal engineering for Suga Wuga Music, Inc.
Jonas Thander – horns
Joi Gilliam – background vocals
Taura Stinson – background vocals
Chonita Gillespie – background vocals
Paul Norris – vocal production assistant, vocal engineering assistant
Sam Holland – engineering
Cory Bice – engineering assistant
Şerban Ghenea – mixing
John Hanes – mixing assistant
Tom Coyne – mastering
Aya Merrill – mastering

Charts

Weekly charts

Year-end charts

Certifications and sales

Notes

Release history

See also

 List of best-selling singles in the United States

References

2014 songs
2014 singles
Nicki Minaj songs
Jessie J songs
Ariana Grande songs
Lava Records singles
Republic Records singles
Number-one singles in Scotland
UK Singles Chart number-one singles
Music videos directed by Hannah Lux Davis
Songs written by Nicki Minaj
Songs written by Max Martin
Songs written by Savan Kotecha
Song recordings produced by Ilya Salmanzadeh
Song recordings produced by Max Martin
Songs written by Rickard Göransson